The 1977 All-Ireland Senior Ladies' Football Championship Final was the fourth All-Ireland Final and the deciding match of the 1977 All-Ireland Senior Ladies' Football Championship, an inter-county ladies' Gaelic football tournament for the top teams in Ireland.

Cavan won by two goals – much media attention was focused on their midfielder Pauline Gibbons, who left the team mid-season to become an Augustinian nun, and received special permission from the Mother Superior to return for the final.

References

Ladies}
All-Ireland Senior Ladies' Football Championship Finals
Cavan county ladies' football team matches
Roscommon county ladies' football team matches
All-Ireland